Antonia Brenner, better known as Mother Antonia, (December 1, 1926 – October 17, 2013) was an American Catholic religious sister and activist who chose to reside and care for inmates at the notorious maximum-security La Mesa Prison in Tijuana, Mexico.  As a result of her work, she founded a new religious institute called the Eudist Servants of the 11th Hour.

Biography 
Brenner was born Mary Clarke on December 1, 1926, to Joseph Clarke and Kathleen Mary Clarke. She was married and divorced twice, and had seven children, living in Beverly Hills, California. She has said that in 1969 she had a dream that she was a prisoner at Calvary and about to be executed, when Jesus appeared to her and offered to take her place. She refused his offer, touched him on the cheek, and told him she would never leave him, no matter what happens to her. At some point in the 1970s, she chose to devote her life to the Church, in part because of this dream.

As an older, divorced woman, Clarke was banned by church rules from joining any religious order, so she went about her work on her own. She founded an order for those in her situation: the Eudist Servants of the Eleventh Hour. In 1983, Brenner received the Golden Plate Award of the American Academy of Achievement. In 2003 her religious community was formally approved by Rafael Romo Munoz, Bishop of the Diocese of Tijuana. On September 25, 2009, she received the Peace Abbey Courage of Conscience Award, presented at the Joan B. Kroc School of Peace Studies at the University of San Diego.

In addition to her normal work involving the prisoners, she negotiated an end to a riot. She also persuaded the jail administrators to discontinue prisoner incarceration in substandard cells known as the tumbas (tombs).

The road outside the jail, known until recently as "Los Pollos" ("The Chickens"), was renamed in November 2007 to "Madre Antonia" in her honor.

She is profiled in the book The Prison Angel, written by Pulitzer Prize-winning journalists Mary Jordan and Kevin Sullivan.

In 2010, Estudio Frontera released a DVD documentary on Mother Antonia's life, La Mama: An American Nun's Life in a Mexican Prison. Produced and written by Jody Hammond, photographed and edited by Ronn Kilby, and narrated by Susan Sarandon, the film took five years to make.

After a period of declining health, Brenner died on October 17, 2013, aged 86, at her Tijuana home.

See also

Notes

References

Faith Inside the Walls, CBC Radio. Documentary about Mother Antonia, by Joan Webber in Vancouver BC. (Includes interview with Mother Antonia)
Reader's Digest article, June 2004: Antonia's mission.

External links 
Mother Antonia Official Website

1926 births
2013 deaths
People from Greater Los Angeles
American humanitarians
Women humanitarians
Roman Catholic activists
Founders of Catholic religious communities
American expatriates in Mexico
People from Tijuana
20th-century American Roman Catholic nuns
21st-century American Roman Catholic nuns